James William Walker (born January 16, 1979) is an American professional golfer who plays on the PGA Tour. After playing in 187 events without a win on the PGA Tour, Walker won three times in the first eight events of the 2014 season. He is a six-time winner on the PGA Tour, and in 2016 won his first major title at the PGA Championship.

Early life
Born in Oklahoma City, Walker and his family later moved to Texas to the San Antonio area, and he graduated from Canyon High School in New Braunfels in 1997. He played college golf at Baylor University in Waco, Texas and turned professional at age 22 in 2001.

Professional career

2003–04: Nationwide Tour
Walker played on the Nationwide Tour full-time in 2003 and 2004. In 2004, he won the first two professional events of his career at the BellSouth Panama Championship and the Chitimacha Louisiana Open. Walker ended the 2004 season as the Nationwide Tour's leading money winner and won Player of the Year honors, while in the process earning his PGA Tour card for the first time.

2005–13: Early PGA Tour career
Walker only played in nine PGA Tour events in 2005 due to injury, making three cuts and a best finish of 17th at the MCI Heritage. He played his first full season on the PGA Tour in 2006, where he played in 21 events. Walker made nine cuts and had one top-25 finish. He ended the season 202nd on the money list, which was not enough to retain his playing rights. Walker went back to the Nationwide Tour in 2007, where he added a third title to his name at the National Mining Association Pete Dye Classic and finished in 25th place on the Nationwide Tour's money list, which qualified him for a PGA Tour card for the 2008 season. Again, Walker endured a difficult season, making 13 cuts in 24 events, with three top-25 finishes. He ended the year 192nd on the FedEx Cup Standings and entered the year end Q-school to try to regain his card. He finished in a tie for 11th, which was enough to regain his card for the 2009 season.

Walker fared better in 2009, where he recorded his first two top-10 finishes on the PGA Tour, including a T5 at the Turning Stone Resort Championship. Walker finished the 2009 season ranked 125th on the money list, securing the last available tour card for the next season. In 2010, Walker made less than half of the cuts he played in, but had a T3 and T4 finish to boost his season's placing. He finished 2010 ranked 103rd on the money list. In 2011, Walker enjoyed his best season to that point, helped by three 4th/T4 finishes throughout the season. He was 68th in the FedEx Cup standings and qualified for the third FedEx Cup playoff event, the BMW Championship, for the first time. Walker followed up a solid 2011 season with another good year in 2012. He finished the year 43rd in the FedEx Cup standings, with six top-10 finishes. Walker started to develop a consistent game on the PGA Tour, evidenced when he made 25 consecutive cuts from the 2012 John Deere Classic to the 2013 Memorial Tournament. During this run, Walker had finishes of T2, T3, and T4 as he finished the 2013 season with over $2 million in tour earnings.

2014–present: PGA Tour victories and success
The 2014 season was the first to begin with six events in the fall of 2013. In the first of these, Walker won his first PGA Tour event at the 2013 Frys.com Open, after nine years and 188 PGA Tour starts. He won by two strokes over Vijay Singh after shooting 62–66 over the weekend. The win gave him an exemption into the Hyundai Tournament of Champions, and earned him his first trip to the Masters Tournament and a PGA Tour card until the end of 2016. Walker also entered the world's top 50 for the first time.

Walker opened up 2014 finishing T21 at his first visit to the Hyundai Tournament of Champions. The following week, he earned his second PGA Tour win at the Sony Open in Hawaii. He birdied four of the final six holes and shot a final round 63 to win by one stroke over Chris Kirk.

Five weeks later, in early February 2014, Walker won the AT&T Pebble Beach National Pro-Am by one stroke over Dustin Johnson and Jim Renner. He had a six-stroke advantage going into the final round, but shot a two-over-par 74 on Sunday and needed to hole a five-foot par putt on the 18th for the victory. This was his third victory of the 2014 season in just eight starts, after previously going 187 events without a victory. With his win, Walker became the leader on the 2014 money list, FedExCup standings, and Ryder Cup points standings. He also raised his Official World Golf Ranking to 24th. A T8 finish at the 2014 Masters Tournament raised his ranking to 19th, and ensured him an invitation into the 2015 tournament. He went on to post top-ten finishes at two other majors, a T9 at the 2014 U.S. Open, and a T7 the 2014 PGA Championship. His highly successful season earned him a spot on the 2014 Ryder Cup, another personal first. Walker went as high as 17th in the OWGR during the 2014 season.

In January 2015, Walker lost in a sudden-death playoff at the Hyundai Tournament of Champions in Hawaii to Patrick Reed. After finishing at 21-under-par in regulation play, Walker was beaten by a Reed birdie on the first extra hole. The following week on tour, Walker defended his Sony Open in Hawaii title with a nine-stroke victory after a final round 63. It was Walker's fourth career PGA Tour victory and it moved him 13th in the OWGR. In March 2015, Walker earned his fifth PGA Tour win and second of the season at the Valero Texas Open with a four-stroke victory over Jordan Spieth. Residing in San Antonio, this meant Walker had claimed victory in his hometown event. The win moved Walker into the world's top 10 for the first time and took him to the top of the FedEx Cup standings. In May 2015, Walker tied for second place at the AT&T Byron Nelson. For the season, Walker had two victories and two second-place finishes, putting him in the top-10 on the PGA Tour money list for the second year in a row.

At the 2016 PGA Championship at Baltusrol Golf Club, Walker shot a 65 in the first round to hold the lead by one stroke. This represented the first time that he had ever led a major in his career. He followed this with a 66 in the second round for a 9-under total and share of the halfway lead with Robert Streb. After a washout on Saturday, Walker shot a third round 68 on Sunday morning, finishing with a birdie on the 18th hole to take the 54-hole lead by one stroke. Sunday evening saw Walker shoot a bogey-free round of 67 to capture his first major championship, winning by one stroke over Jason Day, who after eagleing the 18th hole forced Walker to make par for the championship. Walker, in his third shot, played a safe approach from the rough to the green, taking two putts to make par and maintain his 1-shot lead for his first major title.

Personal
Walker is married to the former Erin Stiegemeier, whom he met while she served as a volunteer at a 2004 Nationwide Tour event. His wife is a nationally ranked show jumper, and they have two sons. Walker is also an avid astrophotographer; his photos have been featured on Astronomy Picture of the Day (APOD). His home golf course is Cordillera Ranch Golf Club in Boerne, Texas.

In April 2017, Walker revealed that he had contracted Lyme disease, however he hopes to avoid taking any time off from the tour.

Professional wins (10)

PGA Tour wins (6)

PGA Tour playoff record (0–1)

Nationwide Tour wins (3)

Canadian Tour wins (1)

Major championships

Wins (1)

Results timeline
Results not in chronological order in 2020.

CUT = missed the half-way cut
"T" = tied
NT = No tournament due to COVID-19 pandemic

Summary

Most consecutive cuts made – 7 (2014 Masters – 2015 Open)
Longest streak of top-10s – 2 (2014 Masters – 2014 U.S. Open)

Results in The Players Championship

CUT = missed the halfway cut
"T" indicates a tie for a place
C = Canceled after the first round due to the COVID-19 pandemic

Results in World Golf Championships
Results not in chronological order prior to 2015.

QF, R16, R32, R64 = Round in which player lost in match play
"T" = Tied

PGA Tour career summary

* As of 2020 season

U.S. national team appearances
Professional
Ryder Cup: 2014, 2016 (winners)
Presidents Cup: 2015 (winners)
World Cup: 2016

See also
2004 Nationwide Tour graduates
2007 Nationwide Tour graduates
2008 PGA Tour Qualifying School graduates
List of golfers with most PGA Tour wins

References

External links

American male golfers
Baylor Bears men's golfers
PGA Tour golfers
Winners of men's major golf championships
Ryder Cup competitors for the United States
Korn Ferry Tour graduates
Golfers from Oklahoma
Golfers from San Antonio
Sportspeople from Oklahoma City
Sportspeople from New Braunfels, Texas
People from Boerne, Texas
1979 births
Living people